Joseph Finney House is a historic home located in Penn Township, Parke County, Indiana. It was built in 1827, and is a two-story, Continental hewn log structure with a side-gable roof.  It has a frame ell.  The original log structure measures 24 feet wide and 16 feet deep.

It was added to the National Register of Historic Places in 2002.

References

Log houses in the United States
Houses on the National Register of Historic Places in Indiana
Houses completed in 1827
Buildings and structures in Parke County, Indiana
National Register of Historic Places in Parke County, Indiana
Log buildings and structures on the National Register of Historic Places in Indiana
1827 establishments in Indiana